Antelope Hill is an American white nationalist publisher based in Montgomery County, Pennsylvania. It is known for selling translations of historical works by Nazis, fascists and ultranationalists, as well as new works by far-right writers. It was founded in 2020. The SPLC has called Antelope Hill an antisemitic hate group. Translations have included works by Adolf Hitler, the Belgian Nazi war criminal Leon Degrelle, the Nazi-sympathizing authors Julius Evola and Wilfrid Bade, and others. Most of the translations are credited to pseudonyms, including one credited to an online neo-Nazi message board, according to the SPLC.

History 
The company was founded on February 18, 2020, by recent Penn State graduates Vincent Cucchiara and Sarah Cucchiara (née Nahrgang), who are married, and Dmitri Loutsik. The three founders kept their identities secret while incorporating the company, but their names were revealed by an investigation by the Southern Poverty Law Center (SPLC) in 2022. In Pennsylvania the company is registered under a foreign owner. The company's website says it aims to publish books relating to "lost causes, righteous mercenaries, anonymous critics, freedom fighters, revolutionaries, and exiles". The SPLC said contemporary authors in Antelope Hill's catalog "repeatedly spread conspiracy theories blaming perceived problems on Jewish people, as well as dehumanizing Black and LGBTQ people". 

The Cucchiaras and Loutsik have been active in the white power movement and have cooperated with far-right members of The Right Stuff network, according to the SPLC. At Penn State, Vincent Cucchiara and Loutsik were active members of the Bull-Moose Party, a campus group described as alt-right which was formed to support Donald Trump in the 2016 United States Presidential Election. Sarah Cucchiara has used the alias "Margaret Bauer" on far-right podcasts, as well as on Twitter via the handle @MargaretBauer88, according to the SPLC ("88" is often used as code for "heil Hitler"). The SPLC states that Sarah Cucchiara was a Norristown-area public school teacher who left the job after a controversy about racist posts on Facebook. The SPLC said Antelope Hill collaborates frequently with "a pro-Hitler white supremacist group", the National Justice Party. 

In 2022, Antelope Hill was one of the white nationalist publishers reported to be included in offerings to public libraries by the ebook service Hoopla. Librarians quoted by WGBH expressed frustration that misinformation was being spread by the service, with funding from taxpayers and library contributors. The SPLC said Antelope Hill boasts of its books' success in trending in obscure sales subcategories on Amazon.

Raw Egg Nationalist, a pseudonymous author published by Antelope Hill, appeared in The End of Men, a 2022 documentary by Tucker Carlson.

Imprints
Jackalope Hill (Fiction Imprint)
Little Frog Hill (Children’s Book Imprint)

References

External links
 Official site

Book publishing companies
Book publishing companies based in Pennsylvania
Publishing companies established in 2020
American companies established in 2020
Neo-Nazism in the United States
White nationalism in Pennsylvania